The temple fade, also known as a Brooklyn fade, low fade, taper fade, blowout, and the later burst fade, is a haircut that first gained popularity in the late 90s and early 2000s in African American, Italian American, and Hispanic American barbershops as a variation of the bald fade, originating in New York City and especially Brooklyn.

Overview
The rest of the hair is left the same length, usually , depending on the preference of the client.

The hairstyle's origins emerged alongside New York barber's Shape-Up , edge up, or line up hair style worn by inner city youth and hip hop artists in the early 1980s.

It was trendy mainly in the larger metropolitan areas of the Eastern United States, such as New York, New Jersey, Philadelphia, Boston, Providence, Rhode Island, Chicago, Illinois, Cleveland, Ohio and Detroit, Michigan.

Today it is a popular hairstyle amongst Italian Americans, South Asian Americans, Arab Americans and Mexican Americans and in the American Hip hop, Pop music and House Music subcultures; as well as internationally in countries such as the UK, France, Germany and Spain.

See also
Hi-top fade
List of hairstyles
Rose Evansky

References

2000s fashion
Hairstyles